The following is a list of mountains constituting the Blue Ridge, a mountain range stretching about 450 miles from Pennsylvania to Georgia in the USA. The Blue Ridge is part of the larger Appalachian Mountain Range.

List of mountains (roughly from northeast to southwest)
South Mountain, Pennsylvania/Maryland
Catoctin Mountain, Maryland/Virginia
Sugarloaf Mountain, Maryland (possible outlier)
Elk Ridge, Maryland
Bull Run Mountains, Virginia
Short Hill Mountain, Virginia
Blue Ridge Mountain, Virginia
The "Blue Ridge" proper, Shenandoah Nat'l Park, Virginia
Pignut Mountain, Virginia
Knob Mountain, Virginia
Neighbor Mountain, Virginia
Hawksbill Mountain, Virginia
Old Rag Mountain, Virginia
Apple Orchard Mountain, Virginia
Humpback Mountain, Virginia
Southwest Mountains, Virginia
Peaks of Otter, Virginia
Poor Mountain, Virginia
Brushy Mountain, North Carolina
Holston Mountain, Tennessee / Virginia
Iron Mountains, Tennessee / Virginia / North Carolina
Sauratown Mountains, North Carolina
Moore's Knob, North Carolina
Pilot Mountain, North Carolina
Three Top Mountain, North Carolina
Tomkins Knob, North Carolina
Fire Scale Mountain, North Carolina
Howard Knob, North Carolina
Rich Mountain, Watauga County, North Carolina
Elk Knob, North Carolina
Snake Mountain, North Carolina
Rich Mountain Bald, North Carolina
Crossing Knob, North Carolina
Beech Mountain, North Carolina
Hanging Rock, North Carolina
Peak Mountain, North Carolina
Sugar Mountain, North Carolina
Flattop Mountain, North Carolina
Brier Knob, Avery County, North Carolina
Pixie Mountain, North Carolina
Grandfather Mountain, North Carolina
Grandmother Mountain, North Carolina
Bee Mountain, North Carolina
Spanish Oak Mountain, North Carolina
Unaka Mountains, Tennessee/North Carolina
Big Yellow Mountain, North Carolina
Little Yellow Mountain, North Carolina
Grassy Ridge Bald, North Carolina
Roan Mountain, Tennessee/North Carolina
Bald Mountains
Max Patch
Chestnut Mountain, Caldwell County, North Carolina
Little Chestnut Mountain, North Carolina
Adams Mountain, North Carolina
Brown Mountain Ridge, North Carolina
Black Mountains, North Carolina
Mount Mitchell, North Carolina
Mount Craig, North Carolina
Celo Knob, North Carolina
Great Craggy Mountains, North Carolina
Great Balsam Mountains, North Carolina
Richland Balsam, North Carolina
Black Balsam Knob, North Carolina
Cold Mountain, North Carolina
Chestnut Mountain, Transylvania County, North Carolina
Shining Rock, North Carolina
Plott Balsams, North Carolina
Waterrock Knob, North Carolina
Great Smoky Mountains, Tennessee/North Carolina
Mount Cammerer
Old Black
Mount Guyot
Mount Chapman
Mount Sequoyah
Charlies Bunion
Mount Kephart
Mount Le Conte
Clingmans Dome
Silers Bald
Thunderhead Mountain
Gregory Bald
Standing Indian Mountain, North Carolina
Unicoi Mountains, Tennessee/North Carolina
Big Frog Mountain, Tennessee
Sassafras Mountain, North Carolina/South Carolina
Pinnacle Mountain, South Carolina
Springer Mountain, Georgia
Blood Mountain, Georgia
Brasstown Bald, Georgia
Rabun Bald, Georgia
Black Rock Mountain, Georgia
Currahee Mountain, Georgia
Sawnee Mountain, Georgia

See also 
List of mountains of the Appalachians

Blue Ridge
Blue Ridge
Blue Ridge
Blue Ridge Mountains